Parinaz Izadyar (born August 30, 1985) is an Iranian actress. She has received various accolades, including a Crystal Simorgh and two Hafez Awards.

Career 
Parinaz Izadyar studied graphic design and made her movie debut in 2007 with One Man, One City, and one year later she appeared in Alireza Amini's The Same Day (2008).

She made her first television appearance in Saeed Ebrahimifar's Moon In the Shadow (2009) TV film. Her first series Five Kilometers to Heaven aired on IRIB TV3 in 2011 for which she received acclaim.

Some of Izadyar's other series include Like a Nightmare (2011) and The Times (2012), and Shahrzad (2015–2018). Izadyar has appeared in a number of movies, including Villa Dwellers (2017), Searing Summer (2017), Just 6.5 (2019), and The Warden (2019).

She received the Crystal Simorgh of the Best Actress in a Leading Role for her appearance in Life and a Day (2016) from the 34th Fajr Film Festival.

Filmography

Film

Web

Television

Music video

Theatre

Awards and nominations

See also 
 Iranian women
 List of Mazandaranis
 Iranian cinema
 List of famous Persian women
 List of Iranian actresses

References

External links

Parinaz Izadyar on Instagram

1985 births
Living people
People from Babol
People from Tehran
Audiobook narrators
Iranian female models
Iranian film actresses
Iranian television actresses
Islamic Azad University alumni
21st-century Iranian actresses
Crystal Simorgh for Best Actress winners
Crystal Simorgh for Best Supporting Actress winners